The 2021 Goodyear 400 was a NASCAR Cup Series race was held on May 9, 2021, at Darlington Raceway in Darlington, South Carolina. Contested over 293 laps on the  egg-shaped oval, it was the 12th race of the 2021 NASCAR Cup Series season, and the 51st running of the race.

Report

Background

Darlington Raceway is a race track built for NASCAR racing located near Darlington, South Carolina. It is nicknamed "The Lady in Black" and "The Track Too Tough to Tame" by many NASCAR fans and drivers and advertised as "A NASCAR Tradition." It is of a unique, somewhat egg-shaped design, an oval with the ends of very different configurations, a condition which supposedly arose from the proximity of one end of the track to a minnow pond the owner refused to relocate. This situation makes it very challenging for the crews to set up their cars' handling in a way that is effective at both ends.

Events leading up to the race
When the 2021 NASCAR Cup Series schedule was announced on September 30, 2020, a second race at Darlington was added for May 9, 2021, marking the first time since 2004 that the track had two races on the schedule (the 2020 season, changed by the pandemic, had three races).

On December 11, 2020, Darlington Raceway announced its highly popular NASCAR Throwback weekend would move to the new May 7–9 weekend, effectively making a lineal swap of the two race meetings at the track. On April 14, 2021, longtime NASCAR tire provider Goodyear announced a race sponsorship deal to call the race the Goodyear 400.

Entry list
 (R) denotes rookie driver.
 (i) denotes driver who are ineligible for series driver points.

Qualifying
Brad Keselowski was awarded the pole for the race as determined by competition-based formula.

Starting Lineup

Race

Brad Keselowski was awarded the pole for the second straight race. Aric Almirola slammed the wall after a flat tire while Kyle Busch spun while leading with a flat tire. Martin Truex Jr. dominated by leading the most laps and winning both stages. Cole Custer slammed the wall after contact with Anthony Alfredo while Kurt Busch got into the wall and caught fire after making contact with Bubba Wallace. Drivers split the final stage by pitting for green flag pit stops three different times. Kyle Larson was the only driver to challenge Truex for the lead as lapped traffic caused issues. Truex was able to pull away from Larson and win for his third win of the season.

Stage Results

Stage One
Laps: 90

Stage Two
Laps: 95

Final Stage Results

Stage Three
Laps: 108

Race statistics
 Lead changes: 19 among 10 different drivers
 Cautions/Laps: 6 for 36
 Red flags: 0
 Time of race: 3 hours, 14 minutes and 21 seconds
 Average speed:

Media

Television
The race was carried by FS1 in the United States. Mike Joy, five-time Darlington winner Jeff Gordon and Clint Bowyer called the race from the broadcast booth. Jamie Little and Regan Smith handled pit road for the television side. Larry McReynolds provided insight from the Fox Sports studio in Charlotte.

Radio
MRN had the radio call for the race, which was also simulcast on Sirius XM NASCAR Radio.

Standings after the race

Drivers' Championship standings

Manufacturers' Championship standings

Note: Only the first 16 positions are included for the driver standings.
. – Driver has clinched a position in the NASCAR Cup Series playoffs.

References

Goodyear 400
Goodyear 400
NASCAR races at Darlington Raceway
Goodyear 400